Kampong Buda-Buda is a village in Temburong District, Brunei. The population was 111 in 2016. It is one of the villages within Mukim Bokok. The postcode is PE1151.

References 

Buda-Buda